Dream 15 was a mixed martial arts event held by Fighting and Entertainment Group's mixed martial arts promotion Dream. The event took place on July 10, 2010 at the Saitama Super Arena in Saitama, Japan. The event aired live in North America on HDNet.

Background
A Light Heavyweight Grand Prix was originally expected to start at Dream 14, with an eight-man tournament. However, Dream 15 hosted the opening round of the Grand Prix, with only a four-man tournament.

Alistair Overeem was briefly rumoured to be fighting Ricco Rodriguez, but the fight was called off.

Results

2010 Light Heavyweight Grand Prix Bracket

Notes
After Jake O'Brien failed to make weight, his Light Heavyweight Grand Prix Opening Round bout against Gegard Mousasi was made into a 212-lbs catchweight bout. O'Brien started with a yellow card, a point deduction and a 10% purse deduction.

References

See also
 Dream (mixed martial arts)
 List of Dream champions
 2010 in DREAM

Dream (mixed martial arts) events
2010 in mixed martial arts
Sport in Saitama (city)
Mixed martial arts in Japan
2010 in Japanese sport